Veselíčko is a municipality and village in Přerov District in the Olomouc Region of the Czech Republic. It has about 900 inhabitants.

Administrative parts
The village of Tupec is an administrative part of Veselíčko.

History
The first written mention of Veselíčko is from 1275.

References

Villages in Přerov District